Hydrobioides nassa is a species of a freshwater snail with an operculum, aquatic prosobranch gastropod mollusk in the family Bithyniidae.

This species occurs in Laos, Myanmar and Thailand.

Hydrobioides nassa lives in freshwater rivers, lakes and ponds.

References

Bithyniidae
Gastropods described in 1865